Paul Mackintosh Orgill Massey (12 March 1926 – 21 October 2009) was a British rower who competed in the 1948 Summer Olympics and in the 1952 Summer Olympics.

In 1948 Massey was a crew member of the British boat which won the silver medal in the eights. Four years later he finished fourth with the British boat in the coxed fours competition. In 1949 and 1950, he was a member of the victorious Cambridge crew in the Boat Race.

A mountain, Massey Heights, is named after him in Antarctica, and he was Master of the Worshipful Company of Grocers.

See also
List of Cambridge University Boat Race crews

External links
 Paul Massey's profile at Sports Reference.com
 Paul Massey's obituary

1926 births
2009 deaths
British male rowers
Cambridge University Boat Club rowers
Olympic rowers of Great Britain
Rowers at the 1948 Summer Olympics
Rowers at the 1952 Summer Olympics
Olympic silver medallists for Great Britain
Olympic medalists in rowing
Medalists at the 1948 Summer Olympics